= Leskowsky Hangszergyűjtemény =

Museum in Hungary

Coordinates: 46°54′36″N 19°41′55″E

Leskowsky Musical Instrument Museum
- Leskowsky Hangszergyűjtemény
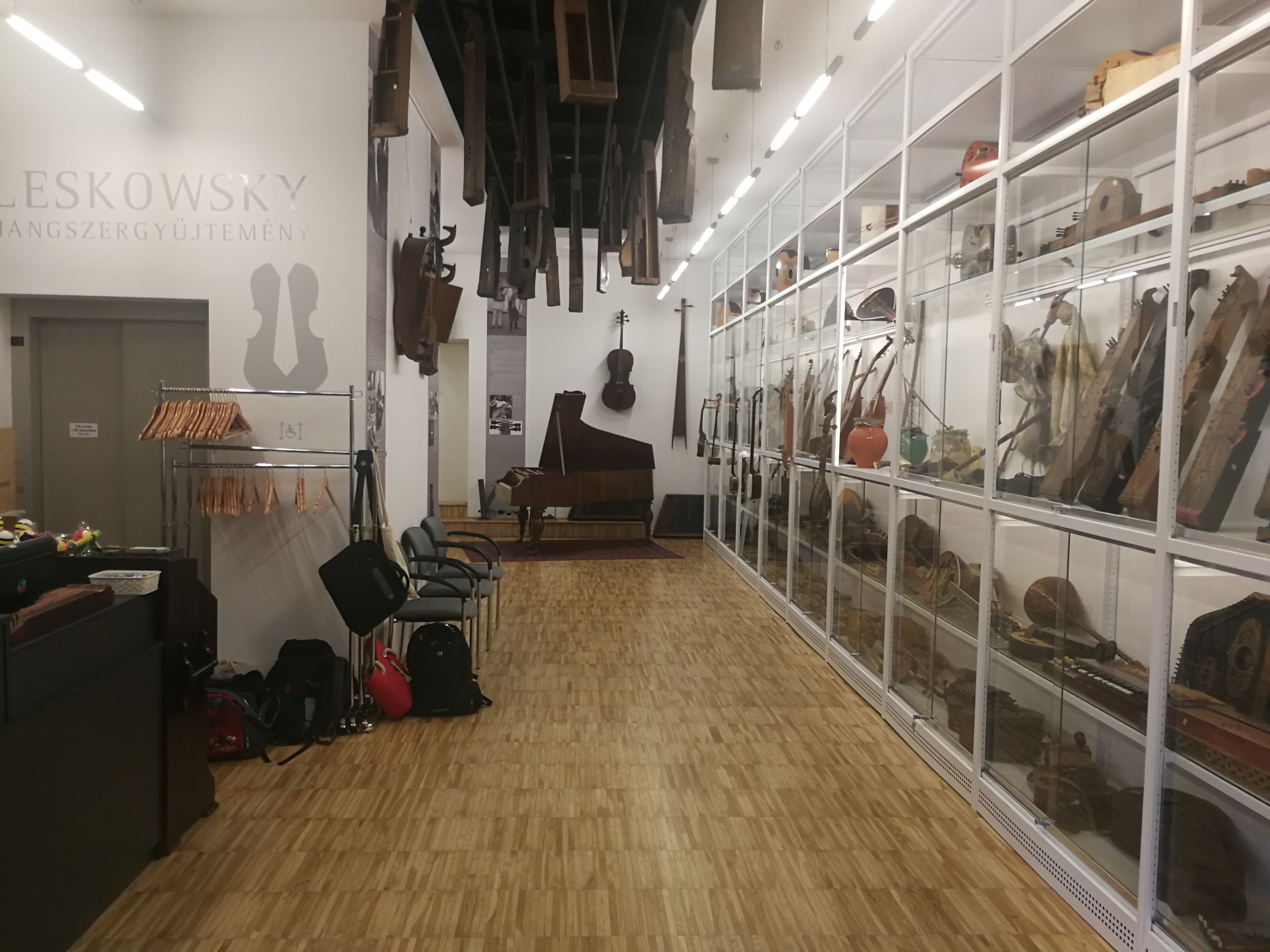
- Interior of one of the museum's rooms
- Established: 1979
- Founder: Albert Leskowsky
- Website: hangszergyujtemeny.hu

Leskowsky Hangszergyűjtemény (Leskowsky Musical Museum) is a museum in Kecskemét, Hungary.

It is the largest exhibition of musical instruments in Hungary. The exhibition consists of different instruments, both domestic and foreign.

The museum was founded in 1979 by Albert Leskowsky.
